Mark Walsh (born 28 April 1972) is an Australian cricketer. He played twelve first-class matches for Western Australia between 1998/99 and 2000/01.

See also
 List of Western Australia first-class cricketers

References

External links
 

1972 births
Living people
Australian cricketers
Western Australia cricketers